Preston N. Jacobus (February 25, 1864 – November 28, 1911) was an American real estate developer, businessman, and politician.  He served one term as Mayor of Tucson, Arizona Territory.
Jacobus was a member of the Republican Party.

Named after Preston Jacobus

References

1864 births
1911 deaths
Mayors of Tucson, Arizona
19th-century American politicians